Wang Jauo-hueyi (born 12 February 1966) is a Taiwanese bobsledder. He competed in the four man event at the 1988 Winter Olympics.

References

1966 births
Living people
Taiwanese male bobsledders
Olympic bobsledders of Taiwan
Bobsledders at the 1988 Winter Olympics
Place of birth missing (living people)
20th-century Taiwanese people